Matej Marin (2 July 1980 – 5 September 2021) was a Slovenian professional racing cyclist, who rode professionally between 2003 and 2015 for the  and  teams. He rode at the 2013 UCI Road World Championships.

Major results

2003
 2nd Overall Tour de Serbie
2004
 2nd Overall Tour de Serbie
2005
 9th GP Kranj
2006
 1st Stage 1 Rhône-Alpes Isère Tour
2008
 6th Tour of Vojvodina I
 7th Tour of Vojvodina II
2009
 1st Tour of Vojvodina I
2010
 1st Banja Luka–Belgrade II
2011
 2nd Banja Luka–Belgrade I
 9th Raiffeisen Grand Prix
2012
 3rd Overall Tour of Szeklerland
1st Stage 1 (TTT)
2013
 Istrian Spring Trophy
1st Points classification
1st Stage 3
 2nd GP Sencur
2014
 1st Grand Prix Sarajevo
 3rd Croatia–Slovenia
2015
 7th Belgrade–Banja Luka I
 9th Croatia–Slovenia

References

External links
 

1980 births
2021 deaths
Slovenian male cyclists
Place of birth missing